Dafydd y Garreg Wen is a traditional Welsh musical air and folk song.

There is a tradition that the tune was composed by David Owen (1712–1741), a harpist and composer who lived near Porthmadog in Caernarfonshire. He was known locally as Dafydd y Garreg Wen. Y Garreg Wen was the name of the farm where he lived near Morfa Bychan. There is a tradition that as Owen lay on his death bed, he called for his harp and composed the tune of the haunting song. He died at the age of 29 and was buried at St Cynhaearn's Church near Porthmadog.

The words were added more than a hundred years later by the poet John Ceiriog Hughes (1832–1887).

A more literal translation would be:-

'Carry', said David, 'my harp to me'
I would like, before dying, to give a tune on it (her)
Lift my hands to reach the strings
God bless you, my widow and children!

Last night I heard an angel's voice like this:
"David, come home and play through the glen!"
Harp of my youth, farewell to your strings!
God bless you, my widow and children!

Another version of this song begins with the line, "David, the Bard, on his bed of death lies", and continues with the second line of the verse being, "Pale are his features, and dim are his eyes". Owen is also well known for his air Codiad yr Ehedydd.

In 1923 the British Broadcasting Company made its first broadcast in Wales, from "Station 5WA" in Cardiff. Mostyn Thomas opened the programme, singing Dafydd y Garreg Wen, and so it became the very first Welsh language song to play on the air.

An arrangement for military massed bands is played annually during the national remembrance Sunday celebrations led by Her Majesty the Queen each November in Whitehall.

References

Welsh folk songs
Year of song unknown